IHR Educational Broadcasting dba Immaculate Heart Radio operated a network of radio stations that aired Roman Catholic religious programming. The network provided a 24-hour a day schedule consisting of call-in talk shows, interviews and broadcasts of the Mass.  Hosts periodically asked for financial donations to fund the network and the operation of its stations.

Immaculate Heart Radio's headquarters were located in Loomis, California. This location also served as its main broadcasting studio, where programming and production work was  done for the stations within the network. The organization got its name from the Catholic devotion to the Immaculate Heart of Mary.

In October 2016, Immaculate Heart Radio and another Catholic radio network, Relevant Radio, announced plans to merge operations. Immaculate Heart Radio served the Western United States and had more than 30 stations in California, Nevada, Utah, Arizona and New Mexico, including 930 KHJ Los Angeles, 1260 KSFB San Francisco, 1000 KCEO San Diego and 1310 KIHP Phoenix. Relevant Radio's network was based mostly in the Midwest and Northeast. The merger was consummated on June 30, 2017; all the station licenses were assigned to Immaculate Heart Media, Inc., while the Relevant Radio name became the on-air branding for the network going forward. The corporate name was changed to Relevant Radio, Inc. in February 2020.

References

External links
 Current official website
 Archive of original website
 Archived photo of front desk
 Yelp page
 Google Maps

Catholic Church in Arizona
Catholic radio stations
Christian radio stations in the United States
Radio broadcasting companies of the United States
Radio stations established in 1997